Woodville is an unincorporated community in Bingham County, in the U.S. state of Idaho.

History
The first settlement at Woodville was made in 1889. A post office called Woodville was established in 1901, and remained in operation until 1905.  The name "Woodville" was applied to the place because a large share of the first settlers were employed hauling wood.

References

Unincorporated communities in Bingham County, Idaho